The 2017 Bill Beaumont County Championship Division 2 was the 16th version of the annual English rugby union, County Championship organised by the RFU for the tier 2 English counties.  This was the first season it would be officially known as Bill Beaumont Division 2 having previously been known as the County Championship Plate.  Each county drew its players from rugby union clubs from the third tier and below of the English rugby union league system (typically National League 1, National League 2 North or National League 2 South).  The counties were divided into two regional pools (north/south) with four teams in each and the winners of each pool meeting in the final at Twickenham Stadium.

Due to changes to the County Championship format (more detail of this below) four new teams were added to the competition, with Hampshire (winners) and Staffordshire (runners up) coming up due to reaching the final of the 2016 County Championship Shield, while Warwickshire and Cumbria were also promoted by virtue of their performances in the competition during the past two seasons.  The changes also meant that there were no teams relegated into the division.

Leicestershire and Hampshire won their respective groups to qualify for the Twickenham final, with Leicestershire being the more impressive with three easy victories. 
The first half of the final was fairly close with Leicestershire going in 8-0 up, but in the second half they added a further four tries to win their first ever Division 2 competition by a final score of 39-7.  It was a well deserved win for Leicestershire who were by the far the strongest county in Division 2 this season and it would be no surprise if they are in the top division in a couple of year's time.

Competition format
The competition format was two regional group stages divided into north and south with four teams in each group. This meant that two teams in the pool had two home games, while the other two had just one.  The top side in each group went through to the final held at Twickenham Stadium. The RFU plans to switch this around the following year so that teams that played one home game in 2017 will get two during the 2018 competition.

Due to changes to the County Championships implemented for this competition there was no promotion for the Division 2 finalists as there had been in previous seasons.  Instead, points will be accumulated over two seasons with the two most successful sides over that period being promoted to the top tier for the 2019 competition.  The RFU has also introduced relegation to the division, with the bottom sides in each group over two years dropping to Division 3.

Participating Counties and ground locations

Group stage

Division 2 North

Round 1

Round 2

Round 3

Division 2 South

Round 1

Round 2

Round 3

Final

Individual statistics
 Note that points scorers includes tries as well as conversions, penalties and drop goals.  Appearance figures also include coming on as substitutes (unused substitutes not included).  Statistics will also include final.

Top points scorers

Top try scorers

Competition records

Team
Largest home win — 
62 - 5 Durham County at home to Cumbria on 6 May 2017
Largest away win — 49 points
62 - 13	Hampshire away to North Midlands on 6 May 2017
Most points scored — 62 (x2)
62 - 5 Durham County at home to Cumbria on 6 May 2017
62 - 13	Hampshire away to North Midlands on 6 May 2017
Most tries in a match — 10 (x2)
Durham County at home to Cumbria on 6 May 2017
Hampshire away to North Midlands on 6 May 2017
Most conversions in a match — 8
Warwickshire at home to North Midlands on 13 May 2017
Most penalties in a match — 4
Hampshire at home to Somerset on 13 May 2017
Most drop goals in a match — 0

Player
Most points in a match — 20 (x2)
 Richard Buck for Hampshire at home to North Midlands on 6 May 2017
 Tom Johnson for North Midlands away to Warwickshire on 13 May 2017
Most tries in a match — 4 (x2)
 Richard Buck for Hampshire at home to North Midlands on 6 May 2017
 Tom Johnson for North Midlands away to Warwickshire on 13 May 2017
Most conversions in a match — 8
 Ben Palmer for Warwickshire at home to North Midlands on 13 May 2017
Most penalties in a match — 4
 Pierre-Alex Clarke for Hampshire at home to Somerset on 13 May 2017
Most drop goals in a match — 0

See also
 English rugby union system
 Rugby union in England

References

External links
 NCA Rugby

2017
2016–17 County Championship